Maire Tecnimont S.p.A. is an Italian group numbering 50 operating companies in the engineering, technology and energy sectors. It deals in plant engineering in oil and gas, chemicals and petrochemicals, in green chemistry and in technology supporting energy transition.

Maire Tecnimont manages large turnkey licensing, engineering, procurement and construction (EPC) projects in different geographical areas. It operates in over 45 countries in four continents through a staff of around 6,300 employees.

In November 2007 it was listed on the Milan Stock Exchange in the FTSE Italia Mid Cap index.

History

Origins
Fiat Engineering S.p.A. was set up in the 1930s under the name "Servizio Costruzioni e Impianti Fiat S.A.", as part of the Fiat Group, for the design and construction of equipment for the manufacture of cars. Subsequently, it specialised in the production of cogeneration and combined cycle plants both in Italy and abroad, with a particular focus on the Middle East and Latin America.

In 1972, this branch of the business ("Servizio Costruzioni e Impianti Fiat S.A.") was made into a separate company and incorporated into a new company, "Fiat Engineering S.p.A.". It later extended its scope of operation in the transport infrastructure sector to include the design of high-speed railway lines and innovative underground railway systems.

Tecnimont S.p.A. was set up by Montedison in 1973 in order to combine the specialist skills of the Engineering and Development departments of Montecatini and Edison, two big names of Italian industry. Montecatini brought the legacy of Giulio Natta (winner of the Nobel Prize for Chemistry in 1963) and its specialism in the production of polyolefin plants, while Edison had been active in energy production since the 19th century.

Launch of the Maire Tecnimont Group
In 2004, Maire Holding acquired Fiat Engineering (later Maire Engineering). Maire Tecnimont was formed in 2005 by Maire Holding's acquisition of Tecnimont. On 27 November 2007, Maire Tecnimont commenced trading on the Milan Stock Exchange by IPO. On 25 March 2008, the company was admitted to the blue chip market of the Italian stock exchange. On 2 August 2010, the company signed a lease contract for two Garibaldi Towers in Milan. Both towers have been renovated.

Acquisitions
In 2008, the Group finalised the acquisition of the entire share capital of :it:Tecnimont ICB Pvt. Ltd. (TICB), a leading Indian engineering services company which was set up by the Kapadia family in 1958. Tecnimont had already acquired a 25% stake in the company in 1996, before acquiring another 25% stake, taking it to 50% ownership in 2000. This acquisition opened up new scope for growth in the Asian market, consolidating the group’s already well-established presence in the Country. The Group has had a presence in India since the 1930s through Tecnimont. Over the last 50 years, it has set up over 20 fertiliser plants and 40 process units.

Also in 2008, the Group acquired Noy Engineering, in order to expand its technological portfolio.
The company is specialized in the design and supply of plants for the production of PET polyester and resin, nylon and acrylic fibres. Active in the chemicals and textiles sectors since 1980, Noy has diversified its expertise around the world and invested in new areas of production.

In 2009, Maire Tecnimont’s acquisition of Stamicarbon allowed it to combine its traditional EPC activities with technology licensing services. The Dutch company was set up in the 1940s as the licensing company of DSM (Dutch State Mines), selling licenses for coal washing plants. It entered the chemicals sector in the 1950s, offering licensing services for urea processes. This became Stamicarbon's main focus area, particularly towards the end of the 1980s, when DSM decided to close its Mining Technology Department. Over the years, Stamicarbon established itself and consolidated a position of global leadership in technology design and innovation in the field of urea production. Thanks to the acquisition of Stamicarbon, Maire Tecnimont was one of the finalists in the “Best foreign acquisition by an Italian company” category at KPMG’s 2010 M&A Awards.

Also in 2009, the Group entered the renewable energy industry with the creation of a new company, Met NewEn, which operates in the biomass and concentrated solar power sector.

In 2010, Maire Tecnimont acquired Technip KTI SpA (TKTI) through the acquisition of a parent company: Sofipart Srl.
Technip KTI, later renamed KT, was set up 40 years ago as a contractor working on the design and production of industrial furnaces, operating under the name Selas Italia. Since then, it became the world’s leading company in the design and construction of hydrogen, ammonia, methanol, ethylene and sulphur plants. In 1974, Selas Italia changed its name to KTI (Kinetics Technology International) and was acquired by the German company Mannesmann Anlagenbau in 1988.
In 1999, it became part of Technip Italy. Thanks to the acquisition of KT, Maire Tecnimont won the “Best acquisition in Italy” award at KPMG’s 2011 M&A Awards.

Creation of Tecnimont CC
In the first half of 2011, Maire Tecnimont created a new company named Tecnimont Civil Construction (TCC) with the aim of developing its business activities in the infrastructure sector. The objective is to synergistically boost the Group's expertise in the infrastructure and civil engineering sectors and to improve performance and profitability.

Digitalisation and green chemistry
In 2016, Maire Tecnimont launched a new phase to bring about the digital transformation of its production processes and to open up to new business areas, such as renewable energy and green chemistry.

Based on this new business direction, in November 2018 Maire Tecnimont set up NextChem, a new company of the Group which would oversee green chemistry projects and projects focusing on energy transition. Among these, the construction of plants for the mechanical recycling of plastic, such as the one in Bedizzole (Brescia).

In July 2019, Stamicarbon – a Maire Tecnimont Group company – acquired the Dutch IT company Protomation in order to continue its process of business digitalisation.

Activities
In 2019, the company's activity was 95% in Hydrocarbons and 3% in Green Energy.

The business activities are geographically located:

 63% in Europe,
 7% in the Middle East,
 2% in North America,
 18% Africa,
 10% Asia.

Group structure 

 Hydrocarbon Processing
 Tecnimont: engineering company and main contractor in chemicals, petrochemicals, oil and gas, energy, infrastructure and civil engineering, with a 50% market share in low-density polyethylene plants and 30% in polyolefin plants
 KT - Kinetics Technology: process engineering contractor
 Stamicarbon: services company acquired from DSM in October 2009, specializing in licensing and intellectual property, world market leader in urea technology with a 54% market share
 Met Gas Processing Technologies
 Renewable & Green
 Neosia Renewables: company specializing in the design and construction of renewable energy plants
 NextChem: company specialized in the green chemicals sector
 New Business Model
 Met Development: corporate services

Shareholders
 GLV Capital - 70.865% 
 Arab Development Establishment (ARDECO) - 3.287%
 Other retail and institutional investors - 25.834%
 Own share - 0.814%

Subsidiaries 
 Sofregaz (France), the company was sold in 2014
 Met Development (Italy)
 TPI - Tecnimont Planung und Industrieanlagenbau GmbH (Germany)
 TWS SA (Switzerland)
 Empresa Madrilena de Ingegneria y Costruccion (Spain)
 Tecnimont Poland (Poland)
 Tecnimont Arabia Ltd (Saudi Arabia)
 Tecnimont do Brasil Ltda (Brasil)
 Tecnimont Russia (Russia)
 Tecnimont Pvt Ltd (India)
 Maire Engineering France
 Sep FOS (50%) (France)
 Tecnimont S.p.A. - Egypt Branch (Egypt)
 On 5 March 2010, Maire Tecnimont acquired Sofipart Srl, which owns 76.1% of KTI Management and 75% of Technip KTI SpA, a company specializing in oil and gas engineering in Rome.
 Stamicarbon (Netherlands)

See also

Fiat
List of Italian companies

References

Manufacturing companies based in Rome
Construction and civil engineering companies of Italy
Engineering companies of Italy
Multinational companies headquartered in Italy
Italian brands
Construction and civil engineering companies established in 1935
Italian companies established in 1935
Construction and civil engineering companies established in 2005
Italian companies established in 2005